José Bernardo Escobar (20 October 1797 - 20 March 1849) was interim President of Guatemala from 28 November 1848 to 1 January 1849. Escobar assumed duties when Juan Antonio Martínez was unable to maintain peace and resigned. Escobar took office only to meet instant opposition from both the Moderate party and the aristocrats and clergy.

References

Presidents of Guatemala
Conservative Party (Guatemala) politicians
1797 births
1849 deaths